Throne of Elves, also known as Dragon's Nest 2: Throne of Elves, is a 2016 Chinese animated adventure romance film directed by Song Yuefeng. It was released in China by Beijing Enlight Pictures on August 19, 2016, in 2D and 3D. It is the sequel to the 2014 animated film Dragon Nest: Warriors' Dawn based on the video game Dragon Nest.

Plot
Alterra is a land divided among humans, elves, beasts, and dragons. Decades ago, the elves and humans drove the beasts and dragons back into the dark mountains. Evil thrives on darkness and draws strength from it. Rage and fury gather from the gem possessed by the black dragon. Waiting for the dragon to reawaken. In recent years, elves and humans have been fighting for territory. And because of this they cannot see the common enemy and a greater evil coming their way. But Nerwin, the elf princess can see the growing storm and thinks Alterra's only hope is to forget the past and ally with the humans. She has decided to act on her own in secret. Courageous but foolish.
<P> Princess Nerwin and Princess Liya head out, but are attacked by Elena who wants elves to rule the world.
<P> In the human world, Lambert is being chased by creatures and Captain B saves him by throwing him an anchor. He thinks he is a fish and fights him.
<P> To Be Continued

Cast

English dub cast
 Ashley Boettcher as Princess Liya
 Ryan Potter as Lambert/"Little Fish"
 Anika Noni Rose as Meyla (named "Elena" in the previous film)
 Julie Nathanson as Queen Mayre (named "Nerwin" in the previous film)
 Gavin Hammon as Prince Alyan
 Kevin Michael Richardson as Barnac (listed as "Captain B")
 Enn Reitel as Blacksmith Berlin
 G. K. Bowes as Elf Captain
 Jon Olson as creature voices
 Stephanie Sheh and Michael Sinterniklaas as additional voices

Chinese voice cast
 Ji Guanlin as Queen Mayre

Reception
The film has grossed  at the Chinese box office.

References

External links
 

Chinese animated films
2016 animated films
2016 films
Beijing Enlight Pictures films
Chinese 3D films
2016 3D films
2010s Mandarin-language films
2010s English-language films
2010s adventure films
2010s romance films
Animated adventure films
Animated romance films
Chinese computer-animated films